The Valencian Community motorcycle Grand Prix is a motorcycling event held in Spain that is part of the Grand Prix motorcycle racing season. The event takes place at the Circuit Ricardo Tormo (also known as Circuit de Valencia). Between 2022 and 2026, Circuit Ricardo Tormo is due to host at least three Grands Prix.

Official names and sponsors
1999: Gran Premio MoviStar de la Comunitat Valenciana
2000–2004: Gran Premio Marlboro de la Comunitat Valenciana
2005: Gran Premio betandwin.com de la Comunitat Valenciana
2006–2007: Gran Premio bwin.com de la Comunitat Valenciana
2008: Gran Premio Parts Europe de la Comunitat Valenciana
2009–2014: Gran Premio Generali de la Comunitat Valenciana
2015–2022: Gran Premio Motul de la Comunitat Valenciana

Winners

Multiple winners (riders)

Multiple winners (manufacturers)

Multiple winners (countries)

By year

References

 
Recurring sporting events established in 1999
1999 establishments in Spain